The Latin Grammy Award for Best Grupero Album was first handed to Los Temerarios during the 1st Latin Grammy Awards ceremony which took place at the Staples Center in Los Angeles, California under the name of Best Grupero Performance. In 2002 it was named Best Grupero Album and was last handed out in 2009 to group Caballo Dorado.  

The male Grupero artist with the most wins and nominations is Joan Sebastian, with two nominations and both wins.  The female Grupero artist with the most nominations and wins is Ana Bárbara, with 4 nominations and one win.  The group with the most nominations and wins is La Mafia with four nominations and one win.  

The grupero act with the most nominations is Guardianes del Amor with five.

Other notable winners include Alicia Villarreal, Grupo Bryndis, and Atrapado.  Some other notable nominees also include Bronco, Marco Antonio Solis, Jennifer Pena, Mariana Seoane, Grupo Limite, Grupo Mojado, and Liberacion.

2000s 

 
Grupera
Grupero Album
Awards established in 2000
Awards disestablished in 2009
Grupero Album
Grupero Album